The Sculptor Group is a loose group of galaxies visible near the south galactic pole.

The Sculptor Galaxy (NGC 253) and a few other galaxies form a gravitationally-bound core in the center of this group.  A few other galaxies at the periphery may be associated with the group but may not be gravitationally bound.  Because most of the galaxies in this group are actually weakly gravitationally bound, the group may also be described as a filament. It is considered to be at an early stage of evolution in which galaxies are still falling into the group along filamentary structures.

Members

The table below lists galaxies that have been identified as associated with the Sculptor Galaxy (and hence associated with the group) by I. D. Karachentsev and collaborators.

The object names used in the above table differ from the names used by Karachentsev and collaborators.  NGC, IC, UGC, and PGC numbers have been used when possible to allow for easier referencing.

Field galaxies

The irregular galaxy NGC 55, the spiral galaxy NGC 300, and their companion galaxies have been considered by many researchers to be part of this group.  However, recent distance measurements to these and other galaxies in the same region of the sky show that NGC 55, NGC 300, and their companions may simply be foreground galaxies that are physically unassociated with the Sculptor Group.  The galaxies NGC 24 and NGC 45 are located in the vicinity of the Sculptor Group, but are now considered background objects.

References 

 
Virgo Supercluster